Heinrich Friedrich Siedentopf (1 December 1906 – 28 November 1963) was a German astronomer and physicist.

He was born in Hannover. In 1930, he became an assistant to Heinrich Vogt, then joined the national observatory in Heidelberg. Between 1940–46 he was a professor of astronomy at the University of Jena, and director of the observatory. In 1949, he was a professor at the University of Tübingen, where he later died of a heart attack.

Professor Siedentopf published a total of 146 papers and a textbook. He studied cosmology, stellar convection,
photometry and the zodiacal light. In 1934, he developed an adjustable iris for the Stetson-Schilt photometer, allowing the observer to adjust the light level directed at the astronomical plate.

Siedentopf crater on the Moon and
the main belt asteroid 5375 Siedentopf were named after him.

References

External links
 

20th-century German astronomers
Scientists from Hanover
Academic staff of the University of Jena
Academic staff of the University of Tübingen
1906 births
1963 deaths